Ruth Ann Wallace was a sociologist and professor.

Her research interests were in sociological theory, sociology of gender, and sociology of religion.

Wallace died in May 2016 from a stroke and complications with Alzheimer’s disease.

Education 
Wallace graduated with a B.A. from Immaculate Heart College in 1961, and an M.A. in Sociology at the University of Notre Dame in 1963.

Her PhD dissertation was on social determinants of change of religious affiliation.

Career 
Wallace taught at George Washington University for 31 years. She was president of the Association for the Sociology of Religion and the Society for the Scientific Study of Religion.

Awards 
She was awarded the Jessie Bernard Award by the American Sociological Association in 1998.

Her other awards include the Stuart Rice Award for Outstanding Contributions to Sociology by the District of Columbia Sociological Society, the H. Paul Douglass Lecturer by the Religious Research Association, the Joseph McGee Lecturer by Marquette University, and was a Distinguished Visiting Scholar at Santa Clara University.

Publications

References 

George Washington University faculty
American women sociologists
Sociologists of religion
Immaculate Heart College alumni
Notre Dame College of Arts and Letters alumni
2016 deaths